Vicker may refer to:

 Vicker, Virginia, U.S.A.; an unincorporated community in Montgomery County
 Van Vicker (born 1977), Liberian-Ghanaian actor
 Angus Vicker, pen name of Henry Gregor Felsen (1916–1995) U.S. YA author

See also
 McVicker (surname)
 Vicar (disambiguation)
 Vickers (disambiguation)